This is a list of notable tabletop role-playing games. It does not include computer role-playing games, MMORPGs, play-by-mail/email games, or any other video games with RPG elements.

Most of these games are tabletop role-playing games; other types of games are noted as such where appropriate.

0-9

A

B

C

D

E

F

G

H

I

J

K

L

M

N

O

P

Q

R

S

T

U

V

W

X

Y

Z

See also

 List of play-by-mail games
 List of role-playing game designers, annotated with a few significant games to which each designer has contributed.
 Timeline of tabletop role-playing games
 List of role-playing game publishers
 List of game manufacturers

References

Role-playing games by name
Name